Fanchon the Cricket is a 1915 American silent drama film produced by Famous Players Film Company and distributed by Paramount Pictures. It is based on a novel, La Petite Fadette by George Sand. It was directed by James Kirkwood and stars Mary Pickford, at the time working for Adolph Zukor and Daniel Frohman. A previous film version of the story was released in 1912 by IMP (later Universal Pictures) and directed by Herbert Brenon.

Fanchon the Cricket is the only film to feature all three Pickford siblings: Mary (in the lead role), Lottie Pickford and Jack Pickford. Milton Berle, Fred Astaire and Adele Astaire are also listed among the cast. Astaire biographer Tim Satchell maintains that the film is the only one to feature the dancing duo of Fred and Adele Astaire. Fred Astaire later said he had no recollection of working on the film. All three roles have yet to be positively confirmed.

Cast
 Mary Pickford as Fanchon
 Jack Standing as Landry Barbeau
 Lottie Pickford as Madelon
 Gertrude Norman as Old Fadette
 Russell Bassett as Landry's Father
 Richard Lee as Didier
 Jack Pickford as the unnamed bully

Release
The film was released in New Zealand in late 1915, playing in Wellington at the People's Picture Palace in mid-December, and playing through January in Greytown.

References

External links
 
 

1915 films
1915 drama films
Silent American drama films
American silent feature films
American black-and-white films
Famous Players-Lasky films
Films based on French novels
Films directed by James Kirkwood Sr.
Paramount Pictures films
Films based on works by George Sand
1910s American films